Los Cerros de San Juan is a populated centre in the Colonia Department of Uruguay.

Geography

Population
According to the 2004 census, it had a population of 60.

Features
The Cerros de San Juan region features sunny summers with cool nights, creating a wide variation in temperatures (up to 18°C). The suitability of the soils for wine growing in the Cerros de San Juan region is due to the rocky nature of the mountains which border the region, with excellent drainage. The red and white grapes grow in pebbly soils.

References

External links
INE map of Cerros de San Juan

Populated places in the Colonia Department